The Moorooduc Quarry Flora and Fauna Reserve is located in Mount Eliza, Victoria, Australia and occupies approximately 27 hectares of land. There are entrances to the reserve located on Allison Road, Canadian Bay Road, Two Bays Road and Station Street near the Moorooduc Railway Station.

History
Rock was quarried using explosives, loaded into dobbin carts and taken to a steam powered crusher. The resulting crushed stone was loaded into larger carts and transported to the Mornington railway line via a spur-line.

1887 - The Moorooduc quarry was established by David Munro.
1888 - A spur-line was built from the quarry to the site which is now Moorooduc station to transport stone and ballast for the construction of a branch line between Baxter and Mornington.
1923 - The Frankston - Hastings Shire Council purchased the site. Stone from the quarry continued to be used for ballasting railway lines and other uses including building, road construction and repairs to the Mornington Reservoir.
1927 - Electricity was introduced and the steam powered crusher which used local timber for fuel was superseded by an electrical crusher.
1932 - Stone from the quarry was used in the construction of stables and garden walls at Cruden Farm owned by Keith Murdoch, father of Rupert Murdoch.
1935 - The cartage of stone by rail was replaced with trucks.
1950s - Stone from Moorooduc quarry featured in houses built in Gulls Way, designed by David Chancellor and W. Rex Patrick.
1961 - The quarry was closed due to flooding. Continuing to fill with water the quarry became a popular swimming spot.
1973 - Frankston Council designated the area a flora and fauna reserve.
1981 - Some scenes for the television mini-series I Can Jump Puddles were filmed at the site of the quarry.
1986 - The movie Frog Dreaming was filmed at the site of the quarry.

After a period of neglect community interest transformed the site into a beautiful nature reserve, one of the best on the Mornington Peninsula.

Current status
The Moorooduc Quarry Flora and Fauna Reserve is located within the boundaries of the Mornington Peninsula and Western Port Biosphere Reserve.

There are several walking tracks throughout the reserve. One track encircles the high cliffs of the quarry and another the lake at the base of the cliffs. Following the path from Station Street will take you past ruins of an explosives store. Rock climbing and abseiling were quite popular in the reserve but is now strictly prohibited.

The Moorooduc Quarry Flora and Fauna Reserve was submitted for listing on the Register of the National Estate prior to the closure of the register in 2007 but was rejected because it was "not of sufficient significance to warrant entry in the Register."

Flora
Four species of eucalyptus and four species of acacia dominate the reserve. Most botanically significant is the diversity and abundance of indigenous native grasses and wildflowers. More than thirty species of orchids have been documented in the reserve. Several of these are classified as of state or regional significance.

Flora found in the reserve:
 Acacia
 Australian indigo (Indigofera australis) 
 Bracken
 Eucalyptus
 Maidenhair fern
 Orchids
 Manna gum
 Cherry ballart
 She-oak

Fauna
At least 45 native species of birds have been recorded as breeding in the reserve and many other species visit to feed or rest. Waterbirds are often seen on the quarry lake. Several bat species have been recorded and infrequent sightings of koalas. The quarry lake and surrounding ponds and dams are home to small to microscopic aquatic creatures and various frogs.

Birds found in the reserve:

 Australasian grebe	Tachybaptus novaehollandiae
 Australian magpie	Gymnorhina tibicen
 Australian pelican	Pelecanus conspicillatus
 Australian white ibis Threskiornis molucca
 Australian wood duck Chenonetta jubata
 Bell miner	Manorina melanophrys
 Black-faced cuckooshrike Coracina novaehollandiae
 Brown falcon Falco berigora
 Brown goshawk Accipter fasciatus
 Brown thornbill Acanthiza pusilla
 Clamorous reed warbler Acrocephalus stentoreus
 Common blackbird Turdus merula
 Common bronzewing Phaps chalcoptera
 Common myna Acridotheres tristis
 Common starling Sturnus vulgaris
 Crested pigeon Ocyphaps lophotes
 Crested shrike-tit Falcunculus frontatus
 Crimson rosella Platycercus elegans
 Dusky moorhen Gallinula tenebrosa
 Dusky woodswallow Artamus cyanopterus
 Eastern rosella Platycercus eximius
 Eastern spinebill Acanthorhynchus tenuirostris
 Eastern yellow robin Eopsaltria australis
 Eurasian coot Fulica atra
 European goldfinch Carduelis carduelis
 Fan-tailed cuckoo Cacomantis pyrrhophanus
 Galah Cacatua roseicapilla
 Golden whistler Pachycephala pectoralis
 Grey butcherbird Craticus torquatus
 Grey currawong Strepera versicolor
 Grey fantail Rhipidura fuliginosa
 Grey shrike-thrush Colluricincla harmonica
 Hardhead Aythya australis
 Hoary-headed grebe Poliocephalus poliocephalus
 Horsfield's bronze cuckoo Chrysococcyx basalis
 House sparrow Passer domesticus
 Laughing kookaburra Dacelo novaeguineae
 Little pied cormorant Phalacrocorax melanoleucos
 Little raven Corvus mellori
 Little wattlebird Anthochaera chrysoptera
 Magpie-lark Grallina cyanoleuca
 Mallard Anas platyrhynchos
 Mistletoebird Dicaeum hirundinaceum
 New Holland honeyeater Phylidonyris novaehollandiae
 Noisy miner Manorina melanocephala
 Olive-backed oriole Oriolus sagittatus
 Pacific black duck Anas superciliosa
 Pacific gull Larus pacificus
 Pallid cuckoo Culculus pallidus
 Peregrine falcon Falco peregrinus
 Purple swamphen Porphyrio porphyrio
 Rainbow lorikeet Trichoglossus haematodus
 Red wattlebird Anthochaera carunculata
 Red-browed finch Neochmia temporalis
 Richard's pipit Anthus novaeseelandiae
 Rock dove Columba livia
 Rufous fantail Rhipidura rufifrons
 Rufous whistler Pachycephala rufiventris
 Satin flycatcher Myiagra cyanoleuca
 Shining bronze cuckoo Chrysococcyx lucidus
 Silver gull Larus novaehollandiae
 Silvereye Zosterops lateralis
 Skylark Alauda arvensis
 Spotted pardalote Pardalotus punctatus
 Spotted turtle dove Streptopelia chinensis
 Straw-necked ibis Threskiornis spinicollis
 Striated pardalote Pardalotus striatus
 Striated thornbill Acanthiza lineata
 Sulphur-crested cockatoo Cacatua galerita
 Superb fairywren Malurus cyaneus
 Tawny frogmouth Podargus strigoides
 Varied sittella Daphoenositta chrysoptera
 Welcome swallow Hirundo neoxena
 Whistling kite Haliastur sphenurus
 White-browed scrubwren Sericornis frontalis
 White-eared honeyeater Lichenostomus leucotis
 White-faced heron Egretta novaehollandiae
 White-naped honeyeater Melithreptus lunatus
 White-plumed honeyeater Lichenostomus penicillatus
 Willie wagtail Rhipidura leucophrys
 Yellow-faced honeyeater Lichenostomus chrysops

Mammals found in the reserve:
 Brushtail possum
 Echidna
 Ringtail possum

Reptiles found in the reserve:
 Blue-tongued lizard
 Eastern snake-necked turtle Chelodina longicollis

Environmental issues
Environmental weeds pose a serious threat to the survival of native flora and fauna in the reserve. Erosion is another issue of concern. Regeneration and revegetation works are slowly overcoming this problem.

Pest plants found in the reserve:
 Boneseed Chrysanthemoides monilifera
 Blackberries
 Dandelions

See also
 Frog Dreaming
 Moorooduc
 Moorooduc Station
 Mornington
 Mornington Peninsula
 Mornington Railway
 Mount Eliza

References

External links
A Priceless Flora & Fauna Reserve - Mount Eliza Association for Environmental Care
Photo of the Moorooduc Quarry Lake & Map 
Photo of the Ruins of an explosives store at Moorooduc Quarry & Map 
Photo of Moorooduc Quarry taken in 1935
Coastal Arts - Includes architecture featuring quarry stone
Mornington Railway Preservation Society
BAYBOCA - Moorooduc Quarry Birdlists
Mornington Peninsula Tourism Official Website
Friends of Mount Eliza Regional Park 
Cruden Farm

Mornington Peninsula
Quarries in Australia
1973 establishments in Australia